Banana is an Asian American themed magazine founded by Vicki Ho and Kathleen Tso. The magazine has its headquarters in Manhattan's Chinatown.

Origins
Banana magazine was established in 2014. In an HuffPost interview, the co-founders of the magazine described the origins of the magazine's title, "The name "Banana" comes from a term common in East Asian communities. "The choice for the name Banana is meant to be an inside joke," the magazine's founders say.

"For anyone who has ever been called a 'banana,' you know that it’s a nickname that has been given to many first-generation Asians growing up in a western world, like us. It’s not meant to be derogatory, but celebratory," they write on the magazine's website."

References

External links

2014 establishments in New York (state)
Annual magazines published in the United States
Asian-American magazines
Magazines established in 2014
Magazines published in New York City
Women's magazines published in the United States